The Ambassador of the United Kingdom to Morocco is the United Kingdom's foremost diplomatic representative in Morocco, and head of the UK's diplomatic mission there.  The official title is His Britannic Majesty's Ambassador to the Kingdom of Morocco.

The British Ambassador to Morocco was also non-resident ambassador to the Islamic Republic of Mauritania from 1990 until the United Kingdom appointed a resident ambassador to Mauritania in 2018. The Morocco embassy also covers Western Sahara, a disputed territory with which the UK does not have official diplomatic relations.

Besides the embassy in Rabat, the British government maintains a Consulate General in Casablanca and an Honorary Consulate in Marrakech.

Heads of Mission

Ambassadors
John Harrison (1610, 1613, 1615 and 1627)
?: William Rainsborough
1679: Henry Howard, 6th Duke of Norfolk
1681: Sir James Leslie
1721: The Hon. Charles Stewart

Ministers
1829-1845: Edward Drummond-Hay (Consul-general)
1845–1886: Sir John Drummond-Hay (1845 Agent and Consul-General, 1856 Chargé d'Affaires, 1860 Minister Resident, 1872 Minister Plenipotentiary, 1880 Envoy Extraordinary and Minister Plenipotentiary)
1886–1891: Sir William Kirby Green (Envoy Extraordinary and Minister Plenipotentiary)
1891–1893: Sir Charles Euan-Smith (Envoy Extraordinary and Minister Plenipotentiary)
1893–1895: Ernest Satow (Envoy Extraordinary and Minister Plenipotentiary)
1895–1904: Sir Arthur Nicolson (Envoy Extraordinary and Minister Plenipotentiary)
1905–1908: Gerard Lowther (Envoy Extraordinary and Minister Plenipotentiary)
1908–1912: Sir Reginald Lister (Envoy Extraordinary and Minister Plenipotentiary)
1912–1956: Morocco under French protectorate

Ambassadors
1956–1957: Harold Freese-Pennefather
1957–1961: Sir Charles Duke
1961–1965: Sir Richard Beaumont
1965–1969: Leonard Holliday
1969–1971: Thomas Shaw
1971–1975: Ronald Bailey
1975–1978: John Duncan
1978–1982: Simon Dawbarn
1982–1984: Sydney Cambridge
1985–1987: Robin Byatt
1987–1990: John Shakespeare
1990–1992: John Macrae
1992–1996: Sir Allan Ramsay
1996–1999: William Fullerton
1999–2002: Anthony Layden
2002–2005: Haydon Warren-Gash
2005–2008: Charles Gray
2008–2012: Timothy Morris
2012–2015: Clive Alderton
2015–2017: Karen Elizabeth Betts
2017-2020: Thomas Reilly

2020;: Simon Martin

References

External links
UK and Morocco, gov.uk

Morocco
 
 
United Kingdsom Ambassadors
United Kingdsom Ambassadors